David Bruce Barlow (born 1971) is a United States district judge of the District of Utah and a former United States Attorney for the same district.

Education 

Barlow graduated from Brigham Young University with a Bachelor of Arts degree in 1995 and received his Juris Doctor degree from Yale Law School in 1998.

Legal career 

Barlow began his career as an associate at Locke Lord Bissell & Liddell LLP from 1998 to 2000. From 2000 to 2010, he worked at Sidley Austin; first as an associate from 2000 to 2006, and then as a partner from 2006 to 2010. In 2011, he served as general counsel and chief Judiciary Committee counsel to United States Senator Mike Lee.

U.S. Attorney for the District of Utah 

On August 2, 2011, Barlow was nominated to be the United States Attorney for the District of Utah. He was confirmed by voice vote on September 26, 2011. He resigned from the Department of Justice in July 2014.

Return to the private sector 

From 2014–2017, Barlow was again a partner at Sidley Austin. He was Vice President for compliance for Walmart’s Health and Wellness businesses from 2017–2018 in Bentonville, Arkansas. Barlow returned to Utah in 2018, when he became a partner in Dorsey & Whitney's Trial and Government Enforcement & Corporate Investigations Practice groups. Barlow worked at Dorsey & Whitney until becoming a judge.

Federal judicial service 

On May 29, 2019, President Donald Trump announced his intent to nominate Barlow to serve as a United States district judge of the United States District Court for the District of Utah. On June 12, 2019, his nomination was sent to the Senate. President Trump nominated Barlow to the seat vacated by Judge Clark Waddoups, who assumed senior status on January 31, 2019. On July 17, 2019, a hearing on his nomination was held before the Senate Judiciary Committee. On October 17, 2019, his nomination was reported out of committee by a 19–3 vote. On December 3, 2019, the United States Senate invoked cloture on his nomination by a 88–4 vote. On December 4, 2019, his nomination was confirmed by a 88–4 vote. He received his judicial commission on January 6, 2020.

References

External links 
 
 Dec. 9, 2011 Deseret News article on Barlow
 Justice Department bio of Barlow

|-

1971 births
Living people
20th-century American lawyers
21st-century American lawyers
21st-century American judges
Brigham Young University alumni
Judges of the United States District Court for the District of Utah
Obama administration personnel
People associated with Sidley Austin
People from Provo, Utah
United States Attorneys for the District of Utah
United States district court judges appointed by Donald Trump
United States Senate lawyers
Utah lawyers
Yale Law School alumni